Arthur Weber may refer to:
 Arthur E. Weber (1879–1975), German cardiologist
 Arthur L. Weber, American chemist